Aleksandr Anatolyevich Antonov (born 6 July 1958) is a Russian professional football coach and a former player.

External links
 

1958 births
People from Korolyov, Moscow Oblast
Living people
Soviet footballers
Russian footballers
FC Irtysh Pavlodar players
FC Rotor Volgograd players
FC Rostov players
FC Saturn Ramenskoye players
FC Asmaral Moscow players
Russian football managers
FC Asmaral Moscow managers
Association football forwards
Sportspeople from Moscow Oblast